Ferdinand-Alphonse Oklowski (Polish: Ferdynand Alfons Oklowski) was military officer of Polish origin. As a colonel, he took part in the second uprising of the Lower Canada Rebellions as he commanded the Patriote forces in the Battle of Lacolle, on November 6 and November 7, 1838. The Patriote won the first skirmish of November 6 but lost the final confrontation the next day.

See also
Patriote movement
Quebec nationalism
Quebec independence movement
History of Quebec
Timeline of Quebec history

References

Lower Canada Rebellion people
Pre-Confederation Quebec people
Quebec revolutionaries
Canadian people of Polish descent